The 2021 Seattle City Council election were held on November 2, 2021. Two seats of the nine-member Seattle City Council were up for election.

Background

Four incumbent members of the Seattle City Council did not seek reelection in the 2019 election while the three other incumbents won reelection. Mayor Jenny Durkan announced that she would not seek reelection in the 2021 election.

The 2021 election cycle was the 3rd use of Seattle's Democracy Vouchers Program, which other cities and states have looked to replicate.

8th district

Campaign
Teresa Mosqueda, who had served on the city council since her election in 2015, announced on May 5, 2021, that she would seek reelection instead of running in the mayoral election. Kate Martin, who was also running for mayor, announced her campaign for city council on March 23. Michael McQuaid ran in the election, but withdrew after his criminal record involving multiple assaults was reported on.

Campaign finance
Bobby Lindsey, Jordan Elizabeth Fisher, Martin, Paul Glumaz, and Mosqueda are participating in the democracy voucher program.

Endorsements

Primary election

Polling

Results

General election

Polling
Graphical summary

Results

9th district

Campaign
Lorena González, who was first elected in the 2015 election and was selected to serve as president of the city council in 2020, announced on February 3, 2021, that she would run in the mayoral election. Nikkita Oliver, who had run in the 2017 mayoral election, announced that they would run for city council on March 10. Sara Nelson, who had run in the 8th district in 2017, ran in the election. Brianna Thomas, who worked as González's chief of staff, ran in the election.

Campaign finance
Brianna K. Thomas, Corey Eichner, Oliver, and Xtian Gunter are participating in the democracy voucher program.

Endorsements

Primary election

Polling

Results

General election

Polling
Graphical summary

Results

See also
2021 Seattle mayoral election
2021 Seattle City Attorney election

Notes

Partisan clients

References

Seattle City Council
Seattle City Council
Seattle City Council 2021